Hengam Island is an Iranian island located south of Qeshm Island, Iran, in the Persian Gulf.

Geography
The island is generally calcareous and generally low-lying. The distance between Hengam Island and Qeshm Island is about 

The primary economic activity is fishing, as well as some tourism and sightseeing. The main sights of Hengam are the English harbor buildings along with the coal storage, the Portuguese shipwrecks, and aquatic animals such as turtles, dolphins, corals, and sharks.

See also 
Hormozgān Province
List of islands of Iran
List of lighthouses in Iran

Gallery

References

Further reading
 Speak the Wind (Mack, 2021; photographs by Hoda Afshar; essay by Michael Taussig) This work documents the landscapes and people of the islands of Hormuz, Qeshm, and Hengam, all located in the Persian Gulf off the south coast of Iran. Afshar got to know some of the people there, travelling there frequently over the years, and they told her about the history of the place. She said that "their narrations led the project", and she explores "the idea of being possessed by history, and in this context, the history of slavery and cruelty”.

External links
 Picture of Jazīreh-ye Hengām Lighthouse

Islands of Iran
Qeshm County
Landforms of Hormozgan Province
Lighthouses in Iran